The 1990 Chatham Cup was the 63rd annual nationwide knockout football competition in New Zealand.

Up to the last 16 of the competition, the cup was run in three regions (northern, central, and southern). National League teams received a bye until the final 64 stage. In all, 147 teams took part in the competition.

The 1990 final

The final returned to the Cup's early home, the Basin Reserve. It was the first to be decided on penalties. Replays, which had been used in previous tied finals, were no longer used in the Chatham Cup by 1990. The final was close and tense, with three goals to each team. Mount Wellington finished the match with ten men after Dave Witteveen was sent off in extra time. Johan Verweij scored in his fourth successive final - unfortunately for him, in the 1990 final it was an own goal. The penalty shoot-out was no less tense, with several shots having to be retaken.

Mount Wellington and Christchurch United were as evenly matched in the 1990 final as they had been when they met in the epic 1972 Chatham Cup final. That match produced thirteen goals spread across three matches, with eight in the first match alone. The 1990 final was equally exciting, with records being set and plenty of on-pitch action. Among the records were those of Ron Armstrong, who played in his eighth final - equally Tony Sibley with a record which stood alongside father Ken Armstrong's earlier cup heroics as player and coach.

The first half produced three goals. Allan Carville led the way for the southerners, before a wayward backpass from Verweij caught the wind and beat his own keeper to level things up. The Mount took the lead for the first time with a fine curving shot from Noel Barkley, 1990 New Zealand player of the year. From this point on, Christchurch went on the attack, mainly through the efforts of Michael McGarry, but they only produced one goal to show for it, a second for Carville.

Extra time produced more excitement, with a missed penalty from United's skipper Keith Braithwaite. Then in the dying stages, referee Roger Woolmer game a free kick to Mount Wellington close to the Christchurch goal. Keeper Alan Stroud could only parry the ball, and Armstrong stuck the ball home. Christchurch fought back, and with only seconds remaining McGarry deflected a Julyan Falloon cross into the Mount's net.

And so it came down to penalties. Mount Wellington scored with four of their five efforts, from Terry Torrens, Noel Barkley, Grant Lightbown, and Steve O'Donoghue. The only Aucklander failing to find the net was Ron Armstrong, thanks to a fine save from Stroud. It was the Christchurch United kicks which produced the most drama, however. McGarry failed to find the target, and keeper Paul Schofield saved Braithwaite's effort, only to hear the referee calling for it to be retaken, as Schofield had moved. Braithwaite scored from the retaken kick. More was to come, with Verweij's kick having to be retaken not once but twice for the same offence - and Schofield saved on all three occasions. Though Michael Boomer scored with Christchurch's fourth kick, the lead became unassailable after O'Donoghue made it 4–2 for the Mount.

The Jack Batty Memorial Trophy for player of the final was awarded to Michael McGarry of Christchurch United. McGarry became the first player to win this award twice, having also won it in 1989.

Results

Third Round

* Won on penalties by Ngaruawahia (4-3)

Christchurch United received a bye to the Fourth Round

Fourth Round

* Won on penalties by Roslyn-Wakari (6-5) and Gisborne City (6-5)

Caversham received a bye to the Fifth Round

Fifth Round

Sixth Round

Semi-finals

Final

Penalty shootout:
Mount Wellington: Armstrong (saved), Torrens (scored), Barkley (scored), Lightbown (scored), O'Donoghue (scored)
Christchurch United: McGarry (missed), Braithwaite (scored), Verweij (saved), Boomer (scored)

Mount Wellington won 4-2 on penalties.

References

Sources
Hilton, T. (1991) An association with soccer. Auckland: The New Zealand Football Association. .
Rec.Sport.Soccer Statistics Foundation New Zealand 1990 page
UltimateNZSoccer website 1990 Chatham Cup page

Chatham Cup
Chatham Cup
Chatham Cup
Chat